Amina Doumane (September 2, 1990) is a Moroccan computer scientist who on during 2017 won the French Giles-Kahn prize for the best doctoral thesis in France. Her thesis was on the subject On the infinitary proof theory of logics with fixed points. On January 31 2018, Doumane was presented with the award by the French computer science society (SIF).

Research
Her doctoral thesis centered around a circular proof.

Honours, decorations, awards and distinctions
Gilles Kahn prize for best French doctoral thesis, 2017, by the Société informatique de France (SIF).

References

1990 births
Living people
Moroccan computer scientists
Women computer scientists